Eternal is a 2004 film about sixteenth-century Countess Elizabeth Báthory "repeating her crimes in modern day Montreal".

Characters
Mark R. Leeper writes that "Néron's exotic lesbian vampire" in Eternal (2004) "is reminiscent of Dracula's Daughter, though her assistant and victim-procurer Irina (Victoria Sanchez) is much less powerful than Sandor was in the earlier film".

Production run
The film premiered in Canada in September 2004.

Reception
Mark R. Leeper gives the film a 6/10, concluding that the film is "polished, sexy, and entertaining, and the art direction is its best aspect. But it is not a film that will stick with the viewer. It is too similar to films like Jack's Back (about Jack the Ripper returning) and several others".

See also
 Stay Alive, another film inspired by the "Blood Countess".

References

External links
 

2004 films
Canadian vampire films
Cultural depictions of Elizabeth Báthory
English-language Canadian films
2000s English-language films
2000s Canadian films